The Centro de Enseñanza Técnica Industrial (Technical and Industrial Teaching Center), or CETI, is a public, decentralized and federal educative institution in Guadalajara, in the state of Jalisco, Mexico.

CETI is a university involved in the formation of professionals in technology, with self-initiative, quality and skills appropriate in generating and applying technology and innovation. It also promotes research and offers technological services in strategic areas for the development of the industrial sector in the region.

There exist three campuses in Guadalajara's Metropolitan Zone: Plantel Colomos, in the Fraccionamiento Providencia, Plantel Tonalá, in the Municipio de Tonalá and Plantel Rio Santigo in the Fracc. Urbi Paseos de Santiago II, also in the Municipio de Tonalá.

Currently it offers several degrees using the French-based Technologist Educative Model Tecnólogo, and various degrees in engineering (with specializations).

Technologist degrees

In Campus Colomos:

 Tecnólogo en Desarrollo de Software (Software Development)
 Tecnólogo en Control Automático e Instrumentación (Automatic Control and Instrumentation)
 Tecnólogo en Construcción (Urban Building)
 Tecnólogo en Electrónica y Comunicaciones (Electronics and Communications)
 Tecnólogo en Electromecánica (Electromechanics)
 Tecnólogo en Máquinas-Herramienta (Machine Tools and Machining)
 Tecnólogo en Mecánica Automotriz (Automobile Mechanics)
 Tecnólogo Químico en Fármacos (Medicine Processing and Manufacturing)

In Campus Tonalá:

 Tecnólogo en Desarrollo de Software (Software Development)
 Tecnólogo en Calidad Total y Productividad (Total Quality Control and Productivity)
 Tecnólogo Químico Industrial (Industrial Chemistry)
 Tecnólogo Químico en Alimentos (Food Processing and Manufacturing)
 Tecnólogo Químico en Fármacos (Medicine Processing and Manufacturing)
 Tecnólogo en Desarrollo Electrónico (Electronics Development and Design)

In Campus Rio Santiago:

 Tecnólogo en Desarrollo de Software (Software Development)
 Tecnólogo en Calidad Total y Productividad (Total Quality Control and Productivity)

Engineering degrees

In Campus Colomos:

 Ingeniería Industrial (Industrial Engineering)
 Ingeniería Mecatrónica (Mechatronics Engineering)
 Ingeniería en Diseño Electrónico y Sistemas Inteligentes (Electronic Design and Intelligent Systems Engineering)
 Ingeniería en Desarrollo de Software (Software Development Engineering)
 Ingeniería Civil Sustentable

In Campus Tonalá:

 Ingeniería Bioquímica (Biochemical Engineering)

References

External links
 
 Campus Colomos campus website
 Campus Tonalá campus website
 Campus Río Santiago

Universities and colleges in Jalisco
Universities in Guadalajara, Jalisco
Technical universities and colleges in Mexico